Arthur Melvin "Art" Okun (November 28, 1928 – March 23, 1980) was an American economist. He served as the chairman of the Council of Economic Advisers between 1968 and 1969.  Before serving on the C.E.A., he was a professor at Yale University and, afterwards, was a fellow at the Brookings Institution in Washington, D.C.
In 1968 he was elected as a Fellow of the American Statistical Association.

Okun is known in particular for promulgating Okun's law, an observed relationship that states that for every 1% increase in the unemployment rate, a country's GDP will be roughly an additional 2.5% lower than its potential GDP. He is also known as the creator of the misery index and the analogy of the deadweight loss of taxation with a leaky bucket. He died on March 23, 1980 of a heart attack.

Works
 Equality and Efficiency: The Big Tradeoff (Washington, D.C.: Brookings Institution, 1975)
 Prices and Quantities: A Macroeconomic Analysis, see here (1981)

See also
 Okun's law

References

External links
Brookings Inst Bio and Obit
 
 

1928 births
1980 deaths
20th-century American economists
Columbia College (New York) alumni
Columbia University alumni
Economists from New Jersey
Fellows of the American Statistical Association
Fellows of the Econometric Society
People from Jersey City, New Jersey
Neo-Keynesian economists
Yale University faculty
Yale Sterling Professors
Chairs of the United States Council of Economic Advisers